Suzanne Elizabeth Kenealy (born 27 November 1981) is an Irish former cricketer who played as a right-arm medium bowler. She appeared in 4 One Day Internationals and 5 Twenty20 Internationals for Ireland between 2008 and 2010. Her sister, Amy, also played for Ireland.

References

External links

1981 births
Living people
Irish women cricketers
Cricketers from County Dublin
Ireland women One Day International cricketers
Ireland women Twenty20 International cricketers